Herman J. C. Beckemeyer (January 21, 1878–April 8, 1930) was an American lawyer and politician.

Beckemeyer was born in Clinton County, Illinois. He went to University of Illinois at Urbana–Champaign and McKendree University. Beckemeyer also went to the Missouri College of Law. He practiced law in Carlyle, Illinois. Beckemeyer served in the Illinois House of Representatives from 1907 to 1911 and was a Democrat. He also served as mayor of Carlyle. Beckemeyer died at his home in Carlyle, Illinois

Notes

External links

1878 births
1930 deaths
People from Carlyle, Illinois
University of Illinois Urbana-Champaign alumni
McKendree University alumni
University of Missouri School of Law alumni
Illinois lawyers
Mayors of places in Illinois
Democratic Party members of the Illinois House of Representatives